Beaupreopsis is a genus of plant in family Proteaceae, with just one species in the genus, Beaupreopsis paniculata. It is native to New Caledonia on the south of Grand Terre. Its habitat is from open maquis, to mountain area as low scrub, on a substrate of eroded ultramafic rocks.

Characteristics

The plants are shrubs, rarely exceeding 1.50 m in height, with thick branches, scattered and few. They have pseudo-whorled leaves (5-10 x 0, 20-0, 60 cm), more or less toothed or lobed at the apex, cuneate at the base, leathery, venation slightly prominent, petiole short and robust.

Flowers are small, white or pinkish in terminal panicles from 20 to 50 cm. The fruits are small and hairy, containing a single seed.

Ecology
The soils of ultramafic rocks, which are mining terrains, have been a refuge for many native plant species of New Caledonia because they are toxic and their mineral content is poorly suited to most foreign species of plants. On New Caledonia examples of such soils commonly have an excess of magnesium, plus unusually high concentrations of phytotoxic compounds of heavy metals such as nickel.

Often thick, magnesite-calcrete caprock, laterite and duricrust forms over ultramafic rocks in tropical and subtropical environments. The floral assemblages associated with highly nickeliferous ultramafic rocks are indicative tools for mineral exploration.

Systematics
The genus Beaupreopsis is most closely related to the genera Cenarrhenes (Tasmania) and Dilobeia (Madagascar).

References

Proteaceae
Monotypic Proteaceae genera
Endemic flora of New Caledonia
Taxa named by Jean Antoine Arthur Gris
Taxa named by Adolphe-Théodore Brongniart
Taxa named by Robert Virot